Joseph Ralph Brandy (November 6, 1897 – July 20, 1971) was an American football player and coach.

After serving as a United States Army lieutenant in World War I, Brandy enrolled at the University of Notre Dame and became the starting quarterback for the Fighting Irish football team during the undefeated 1920 season—which was the final season for the legendary George Gipp prior to his death from pneumonia. Brandy was also a starting guard and a captain for the basketball team.

After graduation, Brandy accepted a position as a mathematics instructor and coach at the College of St. Thomas—now known as University of St. Thomas in Saint Paul, Minnesota for five years, directing nearly all of the athletic programs, including football, baseball, basketball, and hockey. He also spent one year in the National Football League (NFL) coaching the Minneapolis Marines in 1924.

In 1926, he returned to his hometown of Ogdensburg, New York, where he headed up the Advance News weekly newspaper for 16 years, and also coached for three seasons at the Ogdensburg Free Academy. He then founded radio station WSLB and operated it until the late 1950s, at which time he became president of the board at Claxton-Hepburn Medical Center.

Brandy died on July 20, 1971, at his summer home located on the Saint Lawrence River near Ogdensburg.

Head coaching record

College football

References

External links
 

1897 births
1971 deaths
American football halfbacks
American football quarterbacks
American men's basketball players
Minneapolis Marines coaches
Notre Dame Fighting Irish football players
Notre Dame Fighting Irish men's basketball players
St. Thomas (Minnesota) Tommies baseball coaches
St. Thomas (Minnesota) Tommies football coaches
St. Thomas (Minnesota) Tommies men's basketball coaches
St. Thomas (Minnesota) Tommies men's ice hockey coaches
College men's basketball head coaches in the United States
United States Army personnel of World War I
Basketball coaches from New York (state)
United States Army officers
People from Ogdensburg, New York
Players of American football from New York (state)